Freedom Township is one of the thirteen townships of Henry County, Ohio, United States. As of the 2010 census the population was 946.

Geography
Located in the northwestern part of the county, it borders the following townships:
Clinton Township, Fulton County - north
York Township, Fulton County - northeast corner
Liberty Township - east
Napoleon Township - south
Adams Township, Defiance County - southwest corner
Ridgeville Township - west
German Township, Fulton County - northwest corner

No municipalities are located in Freedom Township.

Name and history
Statewide, other Freedom Townships are located in Portage and Wood counties.

Government
The township is governed by a three-member board of trustees, who are elected in November of odd-numbered years to a four-year term beginning on the following January 1. Two are elected in the year after the presidential election and one is elected in the year before it. There is also an elected township fiscal officer, who serves a four-year term beginning on April 1 of the year after the election, which is held in November of the year before the presidential election. Vacancies in the fiscal officership or on the board of trustees are filled by the remaining trustees.

References

External links
County website

Townships in Henry County, Ohio
Townships in Ohio